Atelognathus praebasalticus is a species of frog in the family Batrachylidae.
It is endemic to Argentina.
Its natural habitats are subtropical or tropical dry shrubland, temperate grassland, freshwater marshes, and intermittent freshwater marshes.
It is threatened by habitat loss.

References

Atelognathus
Amphibians of Argentina
Amphibians of Patagonia
Endemic fauna of Argentina
Taxonomy articles created by Polbot
Amphibians described in 1968
Taxa named by José Miguel Alfredo María Cei